Major General Duleep Justin De Sliva Wickramanayake (5 September 1930 - 29 September 2017) was a senior officer of the Sri Lanka Army. He served as the  Director Operations and Training of the Sri Lanka Army. 

Born in Colombo, Wickramanayake was educated at Ananda Balika Primary School and at Ananda College, Colombo, where he played for the college cricket team and became a sergeant in the college cadet platoon. Joining the Ceylon Army in 1950, he received his training at Mons Officer Cadet School, Aldershot and at Royal Military Academy, Sandhurst. On his return he was commissioned as a second lieutenant in the Ceylon Artillery on 7 February 1952. He was promoted to lieutenant on 7 August 1953, captain on 1 October 1956 and major on 30 January 1962. During this time he attended the young officers course at the Royal School of Artillery, the anti-air craft course at the School of Anti-Aircraft Artillery, Monorbier, the infantry instructors course at the Army Recruit Training Depot, Diyatalawa. Having attended the Army Command and Staff Course at Staff College, Australia he served as SO 11, Army Force – Panagoda and GSO 11 (Training), Army Headquarters. Promoted to Lieutenant Colonel on 1 November 1969, he then served as the officiating Commanding Officer, Ceylon Corps of Military Police before becoming Commanding Officer, 4th Field Regiment Ceylon Artillery in July 1970 and served till January 1973. During the 1971 JVP insurrection he served as the Coordinating Officer for the Matara District and thereafter Kurunegala District conducting counterinsurgency operations. He then served as Aide de camp to the President of Sri Lanka before taking up command of the South Eastern Command having been promoted to the rank of Colonel on 1 January 1974. Having attended the Royal College of Defence Studies, he served as Officiating Commandant, Army Training Centre; Commander, Southern Command; Director Personnel Administration and Director Operations and Training at Army Headquarters. Having  retired from the army, he was promoted to the rank of Major General on 19 September 1985. His awards include the Republic of Sri Lanka Armed Services Medal, Sri Lanka Army 25th Anniversary Medal, Ceylon Armed Services Long Service Medal, President's Inauguration Medal and the Ceylon Armed Services Inauguration Medal.

Death 
Major General D.J De S Wickramanayake (Rtd) passed away in Australia on 29 September 2017.

References

Sri Lanka Artillery officers
Graduates of the Royal College of Defence Studies
Graduates of the Mons Officer Cadet School
Graduates of the Royal Military Academy Sandhurst
Alumni of Ananda College
Sinhalese military personnel
Sri Lankan major generals